The Society for the Social History of Medicine (SSHM) was established in 1970. It is known for its peer-reviewed journal Social History of Medicine and the three book series it has sponsored, Studies in the Social History of Medicine (1989-2009), Studies for the Society for the Social History of Medicine, and Social Histories of Medicine.

References 

1970 establishments in the United Kingdom
Learned societies of the United Kingdom